Zakary Glen Foulkes (born 5 June 2002) is a New Zealand cricketer, who is a right-handed batter and a right-arm medium bowler. He plays for the Canterbury Kings in domestic cricket.

Personal life 
Foulkes was born in Christchurch, in the Canterbury Region. He is the son of Glen Foulkes, who is also a New Zealand cricketer having represented the Canterbury Country. His elder brother Liam Foulkes also currently plays for the Canterbury Country. His younger brother Robbie Foulkes also played school level cricket. He attended his secondary education from St Andrew's College at Christchurch.

Early career 
Foulkes represented the Canterbury cricket team in age level and provincial cricket. He made his debut in under-17 cricket for the Canterbury Under-17s, on 17 January 2019 in the 2018–19 National Under-17 Tournament. He got out for just 10 runs in that match. He also played five matches for St Andrew's College in the 2019 Gillette Cup, a secondary school level cricket competition. On 2 December 2019, he scored 112 runs off 120 balls, and took two wickets, helping his team to win the match against Rosmini College. He was the leading performer for St Andrew's College in that tournament, aggregating 267 runs and taking 9 wickets, contributing his team towards their maiden Gillette Cup title.

He made his debut in under-19 cricket for the Canterbury Under-19s, on 17 December 2020 in the 2020–21 National Under-19 Tournament. He was the joint highest wicket-taker for the Canterbury team in that tournament, grabbing 8 wickets besides scoring 145 runs. His all-round performance helped Canterbury to finish the tournament as the table-toppers.

In October 2021, he was called up to the Canterbury A cricket team for the 2021–22 National Provincial A matches. He played six matches in the tournament, scoring 177 runs including a fifty.

Domestic career

Hawke Cup 
Foulkes represents the Canterbury Country cricket team in the Hawke Cup, a non-first-class annual cricket competition for New Zealand's district associations. In January 2021, he was named in the Canterbury's squad for 2020–21 Hawke Cup. He made an impressive performance in his Hawke Cup debut match, on 29 January 2021, scoring 92 runs and bagging a six-wicket haul.

On 4 November 2022, he took 2 wickets in the first innings and 4 wickets in the second innings, helping his team to win the inaugural match of the 2022 season against Hawke's Bay by an innings and 26 runs. In the very next match, he hit a century, scoring 161 runs and took two wickets against Southland on 13 November 2022. He continued his excellent form in the tournament, hitting another century in the match against Marlborough, on 11 December 2022.

Professional cricket 
He made his List A debut for Canterbury, on 20 February 2022 in the 2021–22 Ford Trophy. He made his first-class debut for Canterbury, on 3 March 2022, against Auckland in the 2021–22 Plunket Shield season. 

In June 2022, Foulkes was awarded professional contract for the first time by Canterbury ahead of the 2022–23 season. In August 2022, he was recruited by the Wynnum-Manly ahead of the inaugural season of the KFC T20 Max, a premier T20 competition for the emerging players, organized by the Queensland Cricket. On 30 August 2022, he smashed an unbeaten 102 runs off 52 balls, guiding his team to win the thriller against Sandgate-Redcliffe by 1 wicket. 

He made his Twenty20 debut for the Canterbury Kings, on 8 January 2023, against the Auckland Aces in the 2022–23 Men's Super Smash. He picked up a wicket conceding 26 runs from 4 overs on his T20 debut match.

References

External links 
 
 

2002 births
Living people
New Zealand cricketers
Canterbury cricketers
Cricketers from Christchurch